Najmuddin Khan is a Pakistani politician who has been a member of the National Assembly of Pakistan from 2008 to 2013.

Political career
He was elected to the National Assembly of Pakistan from NA-25 Dir constituency in 1990 Pakistani general election.

He was re-elected to the National Assembly from NA-33 (Upper Dir) as a candidate of Pakistan Peoples Party (PPP) in 2008 Pakistani general election.

He ran for the seat of the National Assembly from NA-33 (Upper Dir) as a candidate of PPP in 2013 Pakistani general election but was unsuccessful.

He ran for the seat of the National Assembly as a candidate of PPP from Constituency NA-5 (Upper Dir) in 2018 Pakistani general election but was unsuccessful. He received 53,967 votes and lost the seat to Sahibzada Sibghatullah.

References

Living people
Pakistan People's Party politicians
Pashtun people
People from Upper Dir District
Pakistani MNAs 2008–2013
Pakistani MNAs 1990–1993
Year of birth missing (living people)